Zabiče is a village in the Municipality of Ilirska Bistrica in the Inner Carniola region of Slovenia, close to the border with Croatia.

Mass graves
Zabiče is the site of two known mass graves and an unmarked grave from the end of the Second World War. They all contain the remains of German soldiers from the 97th Corps that were killed at the beginning of May 1945. The Yard Grave lies in a yard near the house at Zabiče no. 15 and contains the remains of one soldier.

Church
The local church in the settlement is dedicated to John the Baptist and belongs to the Parish of Podgraje.

References

External links
Zabiče on Geopedia

Populated places in the Municipality of Ilirska Bistrica